The Capital Yacht Club is a yacht club located in The Wharf in Washington, D.C., United States.

References

External links
  – official web site

1892 establishments in Washington, D.C.
Sailing in Washington, D.C.
Sports clubs established in 1892
Yacht clubs in the United States
Southwest Waterfront